Orthotylus lethierryi is a species of bug in the Miridae family that is endemic to Sicily.

References

Insects described in 1875
Endemic fauna of Sicily
Hemiptera of Europe
lethierryi